The 1687 Peru earthquake occurred at 11:30 UTC on 20 October. It had an estimated magnitude of 8.4–8.7 and caused severe damage to Lima, Callao and Ica. It triggered a tsunami and overall about 5,000 people died.

Tectonic setting
The earthquake occurred along the boundary between the Nazca Plate and the South American Plate. The earthquake is likely to be a result of thrust faulting, caused by the subduction of the Nazca plate beneath the South American plate.

The coastal parts of Peru and Chile have a history of great megathrust earthquakes originating from this plate boundary, such as the 1960 Valdivia earthquake.

Damage
The port of Pisco was completely destroyed by the tsunami, with at least three ships being swept over the remains of the town.

Characteristics
The earthquake was probably followed by another large event further to the south. A magnitude of 8.7 has been estimated from tsunami runup heights and by comparison with the earthquake of 1974.

The tsunami was reported in Japan where it produced runups of tens of metres.

Economic impact

Chile has a history of exporting cereals to Peru dating back to 1687 when Peru was struck by both an earthquake and a stem rust epidemic. Chilean soil and climatic conditions were better for cereal production than those of Peru and Chilean wheat was cheaper and of better quality than Peruvian wheat. According to historians  the 1687 events were only the detonant factor for exports to start.

In the 16th and 17th century the principal wine growing area of the Americas was in the central and southern coast of Peru. In Peru the largest wine-making centre was in the area of Ica and Pisco. The earthquake destroyed wine cellars and mud containers used for wine storage. This event marked the end of the Peruvian wine-boom.

See also
 List of earthquakes in Peru
 List of historical earthquakes

References

Sources

Megathrust earthquakes in Peru
1687 Peru
1687 earthquakes
1687 in South America